{{DISPLAYTITLE:Glycerol 2-dehydrogenase (NADP+)}}

In enzymology, a glycerol 2-dehydrogenase (NADP+) is an enzyme that catalyzes the chemical reaction

glycerol + NADP+  glycerone + NADPH + H+

Thus, the two substrates of this enzyme are glycerol and NADP+, whereas its 3 products are glycerone, NADPH, and H+.

This enzyme belongs to the family of oxidoreductases, specifically those acting on the CH-OH group of donor with NAD+ or NADP+ as acceptor. The systematic name of this enzyme class is glycerol:NADP+ 2-oxidoreductase (glycerone-forming). Other names in common use include dihydroxyacetone reductase, dihydroxyacetone (reduced nicotinamide adenine dinucleotide, phosphate) reductase, dihydroxyacetone reductase (NADPH), DHA oxidoreductase, and glycerol 2-dehydrogenase (NADP+). This enzyme participates in glycerolipid metabolism.

References

 

EC 1.1.1
NADPH-dependent enzymes
Enzymes of unknown structure